The 1950–51 Copa Federación de España was the third staging (old competition) of the Copa Federación de España, a knockout competition for Spanish football clubs in La Liga and Segunda División.

The competition began on 13 May 1951 and ended with the final on 1 July 1951, where Córdoba became champion after defeating Baracaldo.

Qualified teams
The following teams competed in the 1950–51 Copa Federación de España:

2 teams of 1950–51 La Liga:

20 teams of 1950–51 Segunda División:

Competition

First round

|}

Second round

|}

Second Round Replay

|}

Third round

|}

Third round Replay

|}

Semi-finals

|}

Final

|}

External links
 at Rfef.es

Copa Federación de España seasons
Fed